is an action role-playing video game released for Japanese mobile phones in 2007 and was later ported to the Android in 2012.

Gameplay

Plot
The Great Goddess, concerned with the increase of evil in Marvel Land and the strengthen of the Tatta tribe, ordered Valkyrie to descent from the sky to help the people. At one point of her adventure, Valkyrie is poisoned and is saved by Sandra, who searches for an antidote for her.

Reception

References

2007 video games
Android (operating system) games
Japan-exclusive video games
Mobile games
Namco games
Video games featuring female protagonists
Action role-playing video games
Video games about valkyries
Video games based on Norse mythology
Video games developed in Japan